DisplayPort (DP) is a digital display interface developed by a consortium of PC and chip manufacturers and standardized by the Video Electronics Standards Association (VESA). It is primarily used to connect a video source to a display device such as a computer monitor. It can also carry audio, USB, and other forms of data.

DisplayPort was designed to replace VGA, FPD-Link, and Digital Visual Interface (DVI). It is backward compatible with other interfaces, such as HDMI and DVI, through the use of either active or passive adapters.

It is the first display interface to rely on packetized data transmission, a form of digital communication found in technologies such as Ethernet, USB, and PCI Express. It permits the use of internal and external display connections. Unlike legacy standards that transmit a clock signal with each output, its protocol is based on small data packets known as micro packets, which can embed the clock signal in the data stream, allowing higher resolution using fewer pins. The use of data packets also makes it extensible, meaning more features can be added over time without significant changes to the physical interface.

DisplayPort can be used to transmit audio and video simultaneously, although each can be transmitted without the other. The video signal path can range from six to sixteen bits per color channel, and the audio path can have up to eight channels of 24-bit, 192kHz uncompressed PCM audio. A bidirectional, half-duplex auxiliary channel carries device management and device control data for the Main Link, such as VESA EDID, MCCS, and DPMS standards. The interface is also capable of carrying bidirectional USB signals.

The interface uses a differential signal that is not compatible with DVI or HDMI. However, dual-mode DisplayPort ports are designed to transmit a single-link DVI or HDMI protocol (TMDS) across the interface through the use of an external passive adapter, enabling compatibility mode and converting the signal from 3.3 to 5 volts. For analog VGA/YPbPr and dual-link DVI, a powered active adapter is required for compatibility and does not rely on dual mode. Active VGA adapters are powered directly by the DisplayPort connector, while active dual-link DVI adapters typically rely on an external power source such as USB.

Versions

1.0 to 1.1 
The first version, 1.0, was approved by VESA on 3 May 2006. Version 1.1 was ratified on 2 April 2007, and version 1.1a was ratified on 11 January 2008.

DisplayPort 1.0–1.1a allow a maximum bandwidth of 10.8Gbit/s (8.64Gbit/s data rate) over a standard 4-lane main link. DisplayPort cables up to 2 meters in length are required to support the full 10.8Gbit/s bandwidth. DisplayPort 1.1 allows devices to implement alternative link layers such as fiber optic, allowing a much longer reach between source and display without signal degradation, although alternative implementations are not standardized. It also includes HDCP in addition to DisplayPort Content Protection (DPCP). The DisplayPort1.1a standard can be downloaded for free from the VESA website.

1.2 
DisplayPort version 1.2 was introduced on 7 January 2010. Other improvements include multiple independent video streams (daisy-chain connection with multiple monitors) called Multi-Stream Transport (MST), facilities for stereoscopic 3D, increased AUX channel bandwidth (from 1Mbit/s to 720Mbit/s), more color spaces including xvYCC, scRGB, and Adobe RGB 1998, and Global Time Code (GTC) for sub 1μs audio/video synchronisation. Also Apple Inc.'s Mini DisplayPort connector, which is much smaller and designed for laptop computers and other small devices, is compatible with the new standard.

1.2a 
DisplayPort version 1.2a was released in January 2013 and may optionally include VESA's Adaptive Sync. AMD's FreeSync uses the DisplayPort Adaptive-Sync feature for operation. FreeSync was first demonstrated at CES 2014 on a Toshiba Satellite laptop by making use of the Panel-Self-Refresh (PSR) feature from the Embedded DisplayPort standard, and after a proposal from AMD, VESA later adapted the Panel-Self-Refresh feature for use in standalone displays and added it as an optional feature of the main DisplayPort standard under the name "Adaptive-Sync" in version 1.2a. As it is an optional feature, support for Adaptive-Sync is not required for a display to be DisplayPort 1.2a-compliant.

1.3 
DisplayPort version 1.3 was approved on 15 September 2014. This standard increases overall transmission bandwidth to 32.4Gbit/s with the new HBR3 mode featuring 8.1Gbit/s per lane (up from 5.4Gbit/s with HBR2 in version 1.2), for a total data throughput of 25.92Gbit/s after factoring in 8b/10b encoding overhead.  This bandwidth is enough for a 4K UHD display at 120Hz with 24bit/px RGB color, a 5K display at 60Hz with 30bit/px RGB color, or an 8K UHD display at 30Hz with 24bit/px RGB color. Using Multi-Stream Transport (MST), a DisplayPort port can drive two 4K UHD displays at 60Hz, or up to four WQXGA displays at 60Hz with 24bit/px RGB color. The new standard includes mandatory Dual-mode for DVI and HDMI adapters, implementing the HDMI2.0 standard and HDCP2.2 content protection. The Thunderbolt 3 connection standard was originally to include DisplayPort1.3 capability, but the final release ended up with only version 1.2. The VESA's Adaptive Sync feature in DisplayPort version 1.3 remains an optional part of the specification.

1.4 
DisplayPort version 1.4 was published 1 March 2016. No new transmission modes are defined, so HBR3 (32.4Gbit/s) as introduced in version 1.3 still remains as the highest available mode. DisplayPort1.4 adds support for Display Stream Compression 1.2 (DSC), Forward Error Correction, HDR10 metadata defined in CTA-861.3, including static and dynamic metadata and the Rec. 2020 color space, for HDMI interoperability, and extends the maximum number of inline audio channels to 32.

1.4a 
DisplayPort version 1.4a was published in April 2018. VESA made no official press release for this version. It updated DisplayPort's DSC implementation from DSC 1.2 to 1.2a.

2.0 
On 26 June 2019, VESA formally released the DisplayPort 2.0 standard. VESA stated that version 2.0 is the first major update to the DisplayPort standard since March 2016, and provides up to a ≈3× improvement in data rate (from 25.92 to 77.37Gbit/s) compared to the previous version of DisplayPort (1.4a), as well as new capabilities to address the future performance requirements of traditional displays. These include beyond 8K resolutions, higher refresh rates and high dynamic range (HDR) support at higher resolutions, improved support for multiple display configurations, as well as improved user experience with augmented/virtual reality (AR/VR) displays, including support for 4K-and-beyond VR resolutions.

Products incorporating DisplayPort 2.0 are not projected by VESA to appear on the market until later in 2021.

According to a roadmap published by VESA in September 2016, a new version of DisplayPort was intended to be launched in "early 2017". It would have improved the link rate from 8.1 to 10.0Gbit/s, a 23% increase. This would have increased the total bandwidth from 32.4Gbit/s to 40.0Gbit/s. However, no new version was released in 2017, likely delayed to make further improvements after the HDMI Forum announced in January 2017 that their next standard (HDMI2.1) would offer up to 48Gbit/s of bandwidth. According to a press release on 3 January 2018, "VESA is also currently engaged with its members in the development of the next DisplayPort standard generation, with plans to increase the data rate enabled by DisplayPort by two-fold and beyond. VESA plans to publish this update within the next 18 months." At CES 2019, VESA announced that the new version would support 8K @ 60Hz without compression and was expected to be released in the first half of 2019.

DP 2.0 configuration examples 

With the increased bandwidth enabled by DisplayPort 2.0, VESA offers a high degree of versatility and configurations for higher display resolutions and refresh rates. In addition to the above-mentioned 8K resolution at 60Hz with HDR support, UHBR20 through USB-C as DisplayPort Alt Mode enables a variety of high-performance configurations:

 Single display resolutions
 One 16K display @ 60Hz with 10bpc (30bit/px, HDR) RGB/ 4:4:4 color (with DSC)
 One 10K display @ 60Hz and 8bpc (24bit/px, SDR) RGB/ 4:4:4 color (uncompressed)
 Dual display resolutions
 Two 8K displays @ 120Hz and 10bpc (30bit/px, HDR) RGB/ 4:4:4 color (with DSC)
 Two 4K displays @ 144Hz and 8bpc (24bit/px, SDR) RGB/ 4:4:4 color (uncompressed)
 Triple display resolutions
 Three 10K displays @ 60Hz and 10bpc (30bit/px, HDR) RGB/ 4:4:4 color (with DSC)
 Three 4K displays @ 90Hz and 10bpc (30bit/px, HDR) RGB/ 4:4:4 color (uncompressed)

When using only two lanes on the USB-C connector via DP Alt Mode to allow for simultaneous SuperSpeed USB data and video, DP 2.0 can enable such configurations as:

 Three 4K displays @ 144Hz and 10bpc (30bit/px, HDR) RGB/ 4:4:4 color (with DSC)
 Two 4K × 4K displays (for AR/VR headsets) @ 120Hz and 10bpc (30bit/px, HDR) RGB/ 4:4:4 color (with DSC)
 Three QHD @ 120Hz and 8bpc (24bit/px, SDR) RGB/ 4:4:4 color (uncompressed)
 One 8K display @ 30Hz and 10bpc (30bit/px, HDR) RGB/ 4:4:4 color (uncompressed)

2.1 

VESA announced version 2.1 of the DisplayPort standard on 17 October 2022. This version incorporates the new DP40 and DP80 cable certifications, which test DisplayPort cables for proper operation at the UHBR10 (40Gbit/s) and UHBR20 (80Gbit/s) speeds introduced in version 2.0. Additionally, it revises some of the electrical requirements for DisplayPort devices in order to improve integration with USB4. In VESA's words:

DisplayPort 2.1 has tightened its alignment with the USB Type-C specification as well as the USB4 PHY specification to facilitate a common PHY servicing both DisplayPort and USB4. In addition, DisplayPort 2.1 has added a new DisplayPort bandwidth management feature to enable DisplayPort tunneling to coexist with other I/O data traffic more efficiently over the USB4 link.

Specifications

Main specifications

Main link 

The DisplayPort main link is used for transmission of video and audio. The main link consists of a number of unidirectional serial data channels which operate concurrently, called lanes. A standard DisplayPort connection has 4 lanes, though some applications of DisplayPort implement more, such as the Thunderbolt 3 interface which implements up to 8 lanes of DisplayPort.

In a standard DisplayPort connection, each lane has a dedicated set of twisted-pair wires, and transmits data across it using differential signaling. This is a self-clocking system, so no dedicated clock signal channel is necessary. Unlike DVI and HDMI, which vary their transmission speed to the exact rate required for the specific video format, DisplayPort only operates at a few specific speeds; any excess bits in the transmission are filled with "stuffing symbols".

In DisplayPort versions 1.01.4a, the data is encoded using ANSI 8b/10b encoding prior to transmission. With this scheme, only 8 out of every 10 transmitted bits represent data; the extra bits are used for DC balancing (ensuring a roughly equal number of 1s and 0s). As a result, the rate at which data can be transmitted is only 80% of the physical bitrate. The transmission speeds are also sometimes expressed in terms of the "Link Symbol Rate", which is the rate at which these 8b/10b-encoded symbols are transmitted (i.e. the rate at which groups of 10 bits are transmitted, 8 of which represent data). The following transmission modes are defined in version 1.01.4a:
 RBR (Reduced Bit Rate): 1.62Gbit/s bandwidth per lane (162MHz link symbol rate)
 HBR (High Bit Rate): 2.70Gbit/s bandwidth per lane (270MHz link symbol rate)
 HBR2 (High Bit Rate 2): 5.40Gbit/s bandwidth per lane (540MHz link symbol rate), introduced in DP1.2
 HBR3 (High Bit Rate 3): 8.10Gbit/s bandwidth per lane (810MHz link symbol rate), introduced in DP1.3

DisplayPort 2.0 uses 128b/132b encoding; each group of 132 transmitted bits represents 128 bits of data. This scheme has an efficiency of 96.%. In addition, a small amount of overhead is added for the link layer control packet and other miscellaneous operations, resulting in an overall efficiency of ≈96.7%. The following transmission modes are added in DP 2.0:
 UHBR 10 (Ultra High Bit Rate 10): 10.0Gbit/s bandwidth per lane
 UHBR 13.5 (Ultra High Bit Rate 13.5): 13.5Gbit/s bandwidth per lane
 UHBR 20 (Ultra High Bit Rate 20): 20.0Gbit/s bandwidth per lane

The total bandwidth of the main link in a standard 4-lane connection is the aggregate of all lanes:
 RBR: 4 × 1.62Gbit/s = 6.48Gbit/s bandwidth (data rate of 5.184Gbit/s or 648MB/s with 8b/10b encoding)
 HBR: 4 × 2.70Gbit/s = 10.80Gbit/s bandwidth (data rate of 8.64Gbit/s or 1.08GB/s)
 HBR2: 4 × 5.40Gbit/s = 21.60Gbit/s bandwidth (data rate of 17.28Gbit/s or 2.16GB/s)
 HBR3: 4 × 8.10Gbit/s = 32.40Gbit/s bandwidth (data rate of 25.92Gbit/s or 3.24GB/s)
 UHBR 10: 4 × 10.0Gbit/s = 40.00Gbit/s bandwidth (data rate of 38.69Gbit/s or 4.84GB/s with 128b/132b encoding and FEC)
 UHBR 13.5: 4 × 13.5Gbit/s = 54.00Gbit/s bandwidth (data rate of 52.22Gbit/s or 6.52GB/s)
 UHBR 20: 4 × 20.0Gbit/s = 80.00Gbit/s bandwidth (data rate of 77.37Gbit/s or 9.69GB/s)

The transmission mode used by the DisplayPort main link is negotiated by the source and sink device when a connection is made, through a process called Link Training. This process determines the maximum possible speed of the connection. If the quality of the DisplayPort cable is insufficient to reliably handle HBR2 speeds for example, the DisplayPort devices will detect this and switch down to a lower mode to maintain a stable connection. The link can be re-negotiated at any time if a loss of synchronization is detected.

Audio data is transmitted across the main link during the video blanking intervals (short pauses between each line and frame of video data).

Auxiliary channel 

The DisplayPort AUX channel is a half-duplex (bidirectional) data channel used for miscellaneous additional data beyond video and audio, such as EDID (I2C) or CEC commands. This bidirectional data channel is required, since the video lane signals are unidirectional from source to display. AUX signals are transmitted across a dedicated set of twisted-pair wires. DisplayPort1.0 specified Manchester encoding with a 2Mbaud signal rate (1Mbit/s data rate). Version 1.2 of the DisplayPort standard introduced a second transmission mode called FAUX (Fast AUX), which operated at 720Mbaud with 8b/10b encoding (576Mbit/s data rate), but it was deprecated in version 1.3.

Cables and connectors

Cables

Compatibility and feature support 

All DisplayPort cables are compatible with all DisplayPort devices, regardless of the version of each device or the cable certification level.

All features of DisplayPort will function across any DisplayPort cable. DisplayPort does not have multiple cable designs; all DP cables have the same basic layout and wiring, and will support any feature including audio, daisy-chaining, G-Sync/FreeSync, HDR, and DSC.

DisplayPort cables differ in their transmission speed support. DisplayPort specifies seven different transmission modes (RBR, HBR, HBR2, HBR3, UHBR10, UHBR13.5, and UHBR20) which support progressively higher bandwidths. Not all DisplayPort cables are capable of all seven transmission modes. VESA offers certifications for various levels of bandwidth. These certifications are optional, and not all DisplayPort cables are certified by VESA.

Cables with limited transmission speed are still compatible with all DisplayPort devices, but may place limits on the maximum resolution or refresh rate available.

DisplayPort cables are not classified by "version". Although cables are commonly labeled with version numbers, with HBR2 cables advertised as "DisplayPort1.2 cables" for example, this notation is not permitted by VESA. The use of version numbers with cables can falsely imply that a DisplayPort1.4 display requires a "DisplayPort1.4 cable", or that features introduced in version 1.4 such as HDR or DSC will not function with older "DP1.2 cables". DisplayPort cables are classified only by their bandwidth certification level (RBR, HBR, HBR2, HBR3, etc.), if they have been certified at all.

Cable bandwidth and certifications 

Not all DisplayPort cables are capable of functioning at the highest levels of bandwidth. Cables may be submitted to VESA for an optional certification at various bandwidth levels. VESA offers four levels of cable certification: Standard, DP8K, DP40, and DP80. These certify DisplayPort cables for proper operation at the following speeds:

In April 2013, VESA published an article stating that the DisplayPort cable certification did not have distinct tiers for HBR and HBR2 bandwidth, and that any certified standard DisplayPort cable—including those certified under DisplayPort1.1—would be able to handle the 21.6Gbit/s bandwidth of HBR2 that was introduced with the DisplayPort 1.2 standard. The DisplayPort1.2 standard defines only a single specification for High Bit Rate cable assemblies, which is used for both HBR and HBR2 speeds, although the DP cable certification process is governed by the DisplayPort PHY Compliance Test Standard (CTS) and not the DisplayPort standard itself.

The DP8K certification was announced by VESA in January 2018, and certifies cables for proper operation at HBR3 speeds (8.1Gbit/s per lane, 32.4Gbit/s total).

In June 2019, with the release of version 2.0 of the DisplayPort Standard, VESA announced that the DP8K certification was also sufficient for the new UHBR10 transmission mode. No new certifications were announced for the UHBR13.5 and UHBR20 modes. VESA is encouraging displays to use tethered cables for these speeds, rather than releasing standalone cables onto the market.

It should also be noted that the use of Display Stream Compression (DSC), introduced in DisplayPort1.4, greatly reduces the bandwidth requirements for the cable. Formats which would normally be beyond the limits of DisplayPort1.4, such as 4K (38402160) at 144Hz 8bpc RGB/ 4:4:4 (31.4Gbit/s data rate when uncompressed), can only be implemented by using DSC. This would reduce the physical bandwidth requirements by 2–3×, placing it well within the capabilities of an HBR2-rated cable.

This exemplifies why DisplayPort cables are not classified by "version"; although DSC was introduced in version 1.4, this does not mean it needs a so-called "DP1.4 cable" (an HBR3-rated cable) to function. HBR3 cables are only required for applications which exceed HBR2-level bandwidth, not simply any application involving DisplayPort1.4. If DSC is used to reduce the bandwidth requirements to HBR2 levels, then an HBR2-rated cable will be sufficient.

In version 2.1, VESA introduced the DP40 and DP80 cable certification tiers, which validate cables for UHBR10 and UHBR20 speeds respectively.

Cable length 

The DisplayPort standard does not specify any maximum length for cables, though the DisplayPort 1.2 standard does set a minimum requirement that all cables up to 2 meters in length must support HBR2 speeds (21.6Gbit/s), and all cables of any length must support RBR speeds (6.48Gbit/s). Cables longer than 2 meters may or may not support HBR/HBR2 speeds, and cables of any length may or may not support HBR3 speeds or above.

Connectors and pin configuration 

DisplayPort cables and ports may have either a "full-size" connector or a "mini" connector. These connectors differ only in physical shape—the capabilities of DisplayPort are the same regardless of which connector is used. Using a Mini DisplayPort connector does not affect performance or feature support of the connection.

Full-size DisplayPort connector 

The standard DisplayPort connector (now referred to as a "full-size" connector to distinguish it from the mini connector) was the sole connector type introduced in DisplayPort1.0. It is a 20-pin single-orientation connector with a friction lock and an optional mechanical latch. The standard DisplayPort receptacle has dimensions of 16.10mm (width) × 4.76mm (height) × 8.88mm (depth).

The standard DisplayPort connector pin allocation is as follows:
 12 pins for the main link – the main link consists of four shielded twisted pairs. Each pair requires 3 pins; one for each of the two wires, and a third for the shield. (pins 1–12)
 2 additional ground pins – (pins 13 and 14)
 3 pins for the auxiliary channel – the auxiliary channel uses another 3-pin shielded twisted pair (pins 15–17)
 1 pin for HPD – hot-plug detection (pin 18)
 2 pins for power – 3.3V power and return line (pins 19 and 20)

Mini DisplayPort connector 

The Mini DisplayPort connector was developed by Apple for use in their computer products. It was first announced in October 2008 for use in the new MacBooks and Cinema Display. In 2009, VESA adopted it as an official standard, and in 2010 the specification was merged into the main DisplayPort standard with the release of DisplayPort1.2. Apple freely licenses the specification to VESA.

The Mini DisplayPort (mDP) connector is a 20-pin single-orientation connector with a friction lock. Unlike the full-size connector, it does not have an option for a mechanical latch. The mDP receptacle has dimensions of 7.50mm (width) × 4.60mm (height) × 4.99mm (depth). The mDP pin assignments are the same as the full-size DisplayPort connector.

DP_PWR (pin 20) 

Pin 20 on the DisplayPort connector, called DP_PWR, provides 3.3V (±10%) DC power at up to 500mA (minimum power delivery of 1.5W). This power is available from all DisplayPort receptacles, on both source and display devices. DP_PWR is intended to provide power for adapters, amplified cables, and similar devices, so that a separate power cable is not necessary.

Standard DisplayPort cable connections do not use the DP_PWR pin. Connecting the DP_PWR pins of two devices directly together through a cable can create a short circuit which can potentially damage devices, since the DP_PWR pins on two devices are unlikely to have exactly the same voltage (especially with a ±10% tolerance). For this reason, the DisplayPort1.1 and later standards specify that passive DisplayPort-to-DisplayPort cables must leave pin 20 unconnected.

However, in 2013 VESA announced that after investigating reports of malfunctioning DisplayPort devices, it had discovered that a large number of non-certified vendors were manufacturing their DisplayPort cables with the DP_PWR pin connected:

The stipulation that the DP_PWR wire be omitted from standard DisplayPort cables was not present in the DisplayPort1.0 standard. However, DisplayPort products (and cables) did not begin to appear on the market until 2008, long after version 1.0 had been replaced by version 1.1. The DisplayPort1.0 standard was never implemented in commercial products.

Resolution and refresh frequency limits 

The tables below describe the refresh frequencies that can be achieved with each transmission mode. In general, maximum refresh frequency is determined by the transmission mode (RBR, HBR, HBR2, HBR3, UHBR 10, UHBR 13.5, or UHBR 20). These transmission modes were introduced to the DisplayPort standard as follows:
 RBR and HBR were defined in the initial release of the DisplayPort standard, version 1.0
 HBR2 was introduced in version 1.2
 HBR3 was introduced in version 1.3
 UHBR 10, UHBR 13.5, and UHBR 20 were introduced in version 2.0
However, transmission mode support is not necessarily dictated by a device's claimed "DisplayPort version number". For example, older versions of the DisplayPort Marketing Guidelines allowed a device to be labeled as "DisplayPort 1.2" if it supported the MST feature, even if it didn't support the HBR2 transmission mode. Newer versions of the guidelines have removed this clause, and currently (as of the June 2018 revision) there are no guidelines on the usage of DisplayPort version numbers in products. DisplayPort "version numbers" are therefore not a reliable indication of what transmission speeds a device can support.

In addition, individual devices may have their own arbitrary limitations beyond transmission speed. For example, NVIDIA Kepler GK104 GPUs (such as the GeForce GTX 680 and 770) support "DisplayPort 1.2" with the HBR2 transmission mode, but are limited to 540Mpx/s, only  of the maximum possible with HBR2. Consequently, certain devices may have limitations that differ from those listed in the following tables.

To support a particular format, the source and display devices must both support the required transmission mode, and the DisplayPort cable must also be capable of handling the required bandwidth of that transmission mode. (See: Cables and connectors)

Refresh frequency limits for common resolutions 

The maximum limits for the RBR and HBR modes are calculated using standard data rate calculations. For UHBR modes, the limits are based on the data efficiency calculations provided by the DisplayPort standard. All calculations assume uncompressed RGB video with CVT-RB v2 timing. Maximum limits may differ if compression (i.e. DSC) or  4:2:2 or 4:2:0 chroma subsampling are used.

Display manufacturers may also use non-standard blanking intervals rather than CVT-RB v2 to achieve even higher frequencies when bandwidth is a constraint. The refresh frequencies in the below table do not represent the absolute maximum limit of each interface, but rather an estimate based on a modern standardized timing formula. The minimum blanking intervals (and therefore the exact maximum frequency that can be achieved) will depend on the display and how many secondary data packets it requires, and therefore will differ from model to model.

Refresh frequency limits for standard video 

Color depth of 8bpc (24bit/px or 16.7 million colors) is assumed for all formats in these tables. This is the standard color depth used on most computer displays. Note that some operating systems refer to this as "32-bit" color depth—this is the same as 24-bit color depth. The 8 extra bits are for alpha channel information, which is only present in software. At the transmission stage, this information has already been incorporated into the primary color channels, so the actual video data transmitted across the cable only contains 24 bits per pixel.

Refresh frequency limits for HDR video 

Color depth of 10bpc (30bit/px or 1.07 billion colors) is assumed for all formats in these tables. This color depth is a requirement for various common HDR standards, such as HDR10. It requires 25% more bandwidth than standard 8bpc video.

HDR extensions were defined in version 1.4 of the DisplayPort standard. Some displays support these HDR extensions, but may only implement HBR2 transmission mode if the extra bandwidth of HBR3 is unnecessary (for example, on 4K 60Hz HDR displays). Since there is no definition of what constitutes a "DisplayPort 1.4" device, some manufacturers may choose to label these as "DP 1.2" devices despite their support for DP 1.4 HDR extensions. As a result, DisplayPort "version numbers" should not be used as an indicator of HDR support.

Features

DisplayPort dual-mode (DP++) 

DisplayPort Dual-Mode (DP++), also called Dual-Mode DisplayPort, is a standard which allows DisplayPort sources to use simple passive adapters to connect to HDMI or DVI displays. Dual-mode is an optional feature, so not all DisplayPort sources necessarily support DVI/HDMI passive adapters, though in practice nearly all devices do. Officially, the "DP++" logo should be used to indicate a DP port that supports dual-mode, but most modern devices do not use the logo.

Devices which implement dual-mode will detect that a DVI or HDMI adapter is attached, and send DVI/HDMI TMDS signals instead of DisplayPort signals. The original DisplayPort Dual-Mode standard (version 1.0), used in DisplayPort1.1 devices, only supported TMDS clock speeds of up to 165MHz (4.95Gbit/s bandwidth).

In 2013, VESA released the Dual-Mode 1.1 standard, which added support for up to a 300MHz TMDS clock (9.00Gbit/s bandwidth), and is used in newer DisplayPort1.2 devices. Older adapters, which were only capable of the 165MHz speed, were retroactively termed "Type1" adapters, with the new 300MHz adapters being called "Type2".

Dual-mode limitations 

 Limited adapter speed Although the pinout and digital signal values transmitted by the DP port are identical to a native DVI/HDMI source, the signals are transmitted at DisplayPort's native voltage (3.3V) instead of the 5V used by DVI and HDMI. As a result, dual-mode adapters must contain a level-shifter circuit which changes the voltage. The presence of this circuit places a limit on how quickly the adapter can operate, and therefore newer adapters are required for each higher speed added to the standard.
 Unidirectional Although the dual-mode standard specifies a method for DisplayPort sources to output DVI/HDMI signals using simple passive adapters, there is no counterpart standard to give DisplayPort displays the ability to receive DVI/HDMI input signals through passive adapters. As a result, DisplayPort displays can only receive native DisplayPort signals; any DVI or HDMI input signals must be converted to the DisplayPort format with an active conversion device. DVI and HDMI sources cannot be connected to DisplayPort displays using passive adapters.
 Single-link DVI only Since DisplayPort dual-mode operates by using the pins of the DisplayPort connector to send DVI/HDMI signals, the 20-pin DisplayPort connector can only produce a single-link DVI signal (which uses 19 pins). A dual-link DVI signal uses 25 pins, and is therefore impossible to transmit natively from a DisplayPort connector through a passive adapter. Dual-link DVI signals can only be produced by converting from native DisplayPort output signals with an active conversion device.
 Unavailable on USB-C The DisplayPort Alternate Mode specification for sending DisplayPort signals over a USB-C cable does not include support for the dual-mode protocol. As a result, DP-to-DVI and DP-to-HDMI passive adapters do not function when chained from a USB-C to DP adapter.

Multi-Stream Transport (MST)  

Multi-Stream Transport is a feature first introduced in the DisplayPort1.2 standard. It allows multiple independent displays to be driven from a single DP port on the source devices by multiplexing several video streams into a single stream and sending it to a branch device, which demultiplexes the signal into the original streams. Branch devices are commonly found in the form of an MST hub, which plugs into a single DP input port and provides multiple outputs, but it can also be implemented on a display internally to provide a DP output port for daisy-chaining, effectively embedding a 2-port MST hub inside the display. Theoretically, up to 63 displays can be supported, but the combined data rate requirements of all the displays cannot exceed the limits of a single DP port (17.28Gbit/s for a DP1.2 port, or 25.92Gbit/s for a DP 1.3/1.4 port). In addition, the maximum number of links between the source and any device (i.e. the maximum length of a daisy-chain) is 7, and the maximum number of physical output ports on each branch device (such as a hub) is 7. With the release of MST, standard single-display operation has been retroactively named "SST" mode (Single-Stream Transport).

Daisy-chaining is a feature that must be specifically supported by each intermediary display; not all DisplayPort1.2 devices support it. Daisy-chaining requires a dedicated DisplayPort output port on the display. Standard DisplayPort input ports found on most displays cannot be used as a daisy-chain output. Only the last display in the daisy-chain does not need to support the feature specifically or have a DP output port. DisplayPort1.1 displays can also be connected to MST hubs, and can be part of a DisplayPort daisy-chain if it is the last display in the chain.

The host system's software also needs to support MST for hubs or daisy-chains to work. While Microsoft Windows environments have full support for it, Apple operating systems currently do not support MST hubs or DisplayPort daisy-chaining as of macOS 10.15 ("Catalina").
DisplayPort-to-DVI and DisplayPort-to-HDMI adapters/cables may or may not function from an MST output port; support for this depends on the specific device.

MST is supported by USB Type-C DisplayPort Alternate Mode, so standard DisplayPort daisy-chains and MST hubs do function from Type-C sources with a simple Type-C to DisplayPort adapter.

High dynamic range (HDR) 

Support for HDR video was introduced in DisplayPort1.4. It implements the CTA 861.3 standard for transport of static HDR metadata in EDID.

Content protection  

DisplayPort1.0 includes optional DPCP (DisplayPort Content Protection) from Philips, which uses 128-bit AES encryption. It also features full authentication and session key establishment. Each encryption session is independent, and it has an independent revocation system. This portion of the standard is licensed separately. It also adds the ability to verify the proximity of the receiver and transmitter, a technique intended to ensure users are not bypassing the content protection system to send data out to distant, unauthorized users.

DisplayPort1.1 added optional implementation of industry-standard 56-bit HDCP (High-bandwidth Digital Content Protection) revision 1.3, which requires separate licensing from the Digital Content Protection LLC.

DisplayPort1.3 added support for HDCP2.2, which is also used by HDMI2.0.

Cost 

VESA, the creators of the DisplayPort standard, state that the standard is royalty-free to implement. However, in March 2015, MPEG LA issued a press release stating that a royalty rate of $0.20 per unit applies to DisplayPort products manufactured or sold in countries that are covered by one or more of the patents in the MPEG LA license pool, which includes patents from Hitachi Maxell, Philips, Lattice Semiconductor, Rambus, and Sony. In response, VESA updated their DisplayPort FAQ page with the following statement:

As of August 2019, VESA's official FAQ no longer contains a statement mentioning the MPEG LA royalty fees.

While VESA does not charge any per-device royalty fees, VESA requires membership for access to said standards. The minimum cost is presently $5,000 (or $10,000 depending on Annual Corporate Sales Revenue) annually.

Advantages over DVI, VGA and FPD-Link 

In December 2010, several computer vendors and display makers including Intel, AMD, Dell, Lenovo, Samsung and LG announced they would begin phasing out FPD-Link, VGA, and DVI-I over the next few years, replacing them with DisplayPort and HDMI.

DisplayPort has several advantages over VGA, DVI, and FPD-Link.
 Standard available to all VESA members with an extensible standard to help broad adoption
 Fewer lanes with embedded self-clock, reduced EMI with data scrambling and spread spectrum mode
 Based on a micro-packet protocol
 Allows easy expansion of the standard with multiple data types
 Flexible allocation of available bandwidth between audio and video
 Multiple video streams over single physical connection (version 1.2)
 Long-distance transmission over alternative physical media such as optical fiber (version 1.1a)
 High-resolution displays and multiple displays with a single connection, via a hub or daisy-chaining
 HBR2 mode with 17.28Gbit/s of effective video bandwidth allows four simultaneous 1080p60 displays (CEA-861 timings), two 2560 × 1600 × 30 bit @ 120Hz (CVT-R timings), or 4K UHD @ 60Hz
 HBR3 mode with 25.92Gbit/s of effective video bandwidth, using CVT-R2 timings, allows eight simultaneous 1080p displays (1920 × 1080) @ 60Hz, stereoscopic 4K UHD (3840 × 2160) @ 120Hz, or 5120 × 2880 @ 60Hz each using 24 bit RGB, and up to 8K UHD (7680 × 4320) @ 60Hz using 4:2:0 subsampling
 Designed to work for internal chip-to-chip communication
 Aimed at replacing internal FPD-Link links to display panels with a unified link interface
 Compatible with low-voltage signaling used with sub-micron CMOS fabrication
 Can drive display panels directly, eliminating scaling and control circuits and allowing for cheaper and slimmer displays
 Link training with adjustable amplitude and preemphasis adapts to differing cable lengths and signal quality
 Reduced bandwidth transmission for  cable, at least 1920 × 1080p @ 60Hz at 24 bits per pixel
 Full bandwidth transmission for 
 High-speed auxiliary channel for DDC, EDID, MCCS, DPMS, HDCP, adapter identification etc. traffic
 Can be used for transmitting bi-directional USB, touch-panel data, CEC, etc.
 Self-latching connector

Comparison with HDMI 
Although DisplayPort has much of the same functionality as HDMI, it is a complementary connection used in different scenarios. A dual-mode DisplayPort port can emit an HDMI signal via a passive adapter.

 As of 2008, HDMI Licensing, LLC charged an annual fee of US$10,000 to each high-volume manufacturer and a per-unit royalty rate of US$0.04 to US$0.15.  DisplayPort is royalty-free, but implementers thereof are not prevented from charging (royalty or otherwise) for that implementation.
 DisplayPort 1.2 has more bandwidth at 21.6Gbit/s (17.28Gbit/s with overhead removed) as opposed to HDMI 2.0's 18Gbit/s (14.4Gbit/s with overhead removed). 
 DisplayPort 1.3 raises that to 32.4Gbit/s (25.92Gbit/s with overhead removed), and HDMI 2.1 raises that up to 48Gbit/s (42.67Gbit/s with overhead removed), adding an additional TMDS link in place of clock lane. DisplayPort also has the ability to share this bandwidth with multiple streams of audio and video to separate devices.
 DisplayPort has historically had higher bandwidth than the HDMI standard available at the same time.  The only exception is from HDMI 2.1 (2017) having higher transmission bandwidth @48Gbit/s than DisplayPort 1.3 (2014) @32.4Gbit/s.  DisplayPort 2.0 (2019) retook transmission bandwidth superiority @80.0Gbit/s.
 DisplayPort in native mode lacks some HDMI features such as Consumer Electronics Control (CEC) commands. The CEC bus allows linking multiple sources with a single display and controlling any of these devices from any remote. DisplayPort 1.3 added the possibility of transmitting CEC commands over the AUX channel From its very first version HDMI features CEC to support connecting multiple sources to a single display as is typical for a TV screen. The other way round, Multi-Stream Transport allows connecting multiple displays to a single computer source. This reflects the facts that HDMI originated from consumer electronics companies whereas DisplayPort is owned by VESA which started as an organization for computer standards. 
 HDMI can accept longer maximum cable length than DisplayPort (30 meters vs 15 meters).
 HDMI uses unique Vendor-Specific Block structure, which allows for features such as additional color spaces. However, these features can be defined by CEA EDID extensions.
 Both HDMI and DisplayPort have published specification for transmitting their signal over the USB-C connector. For more details, see  and List of devices with video output over USB-C.

Market share 
Figures from IDC show that 5.1% of commercial desktops and 2.1% of commercial notebooks released in 2009 featured DisplayPort. The main factor behind this was the phase-out of VGA, and that both Intel and AMD planned to stop building products with FPD-Link by 2013. Nearly 70% of LCD monitors sold in August 2014 in the US, UK, Germany, Japan, and China were equipped with HDMI/DisplayPort technology, up 7.5% on the year, according to Digitimes Research. IHS Markit, an analytics firm, forecast that DisplayPort would surpass HDMI in 2019.

Companion standards

Mini DisplayPort 

Mini DisplayPort (mDP) is a standard announced by Apple in the fourth quarter of 2008. Shortly after announcing Mini DisplayPort, Apple announced that it would license the connector technology with no fee. The following year, in early 2009, VESA announced that Mini DisplayPort would be included in the upcoming DisplayPort 1.2 specification.
On 24 February 2011, Apple and Intel announced Thunderbolt, a successor to Mini DisplayPort which adds support for PCI Express data connections while maintaining backwards compatibility with Mini DisplayPort based peripherals.

Micro DisplayPort 
Micro DisplayPort would have targeted systems that need ultra-compact connectors, such as phones, tablets and ultra-portable notebook computers. This standard would have been physically smaller than the currently available Mini DisplayPort connectors. The standard was expected to be released by Q2 2014.

DDM 
Direct Drive Monitor (DDM) 1.0 standard was approved in December 2008. It allows for controller-less monitors where the display panel is directly driven by the DisplayPort signal, although the available resolutions and color depth are limited to two-lane operation.

Display Stream Compression 

Display Stream Compression (DSC) is a VESA-developed video compression algorithm designed to enable increased display resolutions and frame rates over existing physical interfaces, and make devices smaller and lighter, with longer battery life.

eDP 

Embedded DisplayPort (eDP) is a display panel interface standard for portable and embedded devices. It defines the signaling interface between graphics cards and integrated displays. The various revisions of eDP are based on existing DisplayPort standards. However, version numbers between the two standards are not interchangeable. For instance, eDP version 1.4 is based on DisplayPort 1.2, while eDP version 1.4a is based on DisplayPort 1.3. In practice, embedded DisplayPort has displaced LVDS as the predominant panel interface in modern laptops and modern smartphones.

eDP 1.0 was adopted in December 2008. It included advanced power-saving features such as seamless refresh rate switching. 
Version 1.1 was approved in October 2009 followed by version 1.1a in November 2009. 
Version 1.2 was approved in May 2010 and includes DisplayPort 1.2 HBR2 data rates, 120Hz sequential color monitors, and a new display panel control protocol that works through the AUX channel. 
Version 1.3 was published in February 2011; it includes a new optional Panel Self-Refresh (PSR) feature developed to save system power and further extend battery life in portable PC systems. PSR mode allows the GPU to enter a power saving state in between frame updates by including framebuffer memory in the display panel controller. 
Version 1.4 was released in February 2013; it reduces power consumption through partial-frame updates in PSR mode, regional backlight control, lower interface voltages, and additional link rates; the auxiliary channel supports multi-touch panel data to accommodate different form factors. Version 1.4a was published in February 2015; the underlying DisplayPort version was updated to 1.3 in order to support HBR3 data rates, Display Stream Compression 1.1, Segmented Panel Displays, and partial updates for Panel Self-Refresh. Version 1.4b was published in October 2015; its protocol refinements and clarifications are intended to enable adoption of eDP 1.4b in devices by mid-2016. Version 1.5 was published in October 2021; adds new features and protocols, including enhanced support for Adaptive-Sync, that provide additional power savings and improved gaming and media playback performance.

iDP 
Internal DisplayPort (iDP) 1.0 was approved in April 2010. The iDP standard defines an internal link between a digital TV system on a chip controller and the display panel's timing controller. It aims to replace currently used internal FPD-Link lanes with a DisplayPort connection. iDP features a unique physical interface and protocols, which are not directly compatible with DisplayPort and are not applicable to external connection, however they enable very high resolution and refresh rates while providing simplicity and extensibility. iDP features a non-variable 2.7GHz clock and is nominally rated at 3.24Gbit/s per lane, with up to sixteen lanes in a bank, resulting in a six-fold decrease in wiring requirements over FPD-Link for a 1080p24 signal; other data rates are also possible. iDP was built with simplicity in mind so doesn't have an AUX channel, content protection, or multiple streams; it does however have frame sequential and line interleaved stereo 3D.

PDMI 
Portable Digital Media Interface (PDMI) is an interconnection between docking stations/display devices and portable media players, which includes 2-lane DisplayPort v1.1a connection. It has been ratified in February 2010 as ANSI/CEA-2017-A.

wDP 
Wireless DisplayPort (wDP) enables the bandwidth and feature set of DisplayPort 1.2 for cable-free applications operating in the 60GHz radio band. It was announced in November 2010 by WiGig Alliance and VESA as a cooperative effort.

SlimPort 

SlimPort, a brand of Analogix products, complies with Mobility DisplayPort, also known as MyDP, which is an industry standard for a mobile audio/video Interface, providing connectivity from mobile devices to external displays and HDTVs. SlimPort implements the transmission of video up to 4K-UltraHD and up to eight channels of audio over the micro-USB connector to an external converter accessory or display device. SlimPort products support seamless connectivity to DisplayPort, HDMI and VGA displays. The MyDP standard was released in June 2012, and the first product to use SlimPort was Google's Nexus 4 smartphone. Some LG smartphones in LG G series also adopted SlimPort.

SlimPort is an alternative to Mobile High-Definition Link (MHL).

DisplayID 

DisplayID is designed to replace the E-EDID standard. DisplayID features variable-length structures which encompass all existing EDID extensions as well as new extensions for 3D displays and embedded displays.

The latest version 1.3 (announced on 23 September 2013) adds enhanced support for tiled display topologies; it allows better identification of multiple video streams, and reports bezel size and locations. As of December 2013, many current 4K displays use a tiled topology, but lack a standard way to report to the video source which tile is left and which is right. These early 4K displays, for manufacturing reasons, typically use two 1920×2160 panels laminated together and are currently generally treated as multiple-monitor setups. DisplayID 1.3 also allows 8K display discovery, and has applications in stereo 3D, where multiple video streams are used.

DockPort 

DockPort, formerly known as Lightning Bolt, is an extension to DisplayPort to include USB 3.0 data as well as power for charging portable devices from attached external displays. Originally developed by AMD and Texas Instruments, it has been announced as a VESA specification in 2014.

USB-C 

On 22 September 2014, VESA published the DisplayPort Alternate Mode on USB Type-C Connector Standard, a specification on how to send DisplayPort signals over the newly released USB-C connector. One, two or all four of the differential pairs that USB uses for the SuperSpeed bus can be configured dynamically to be used for DisplayPort lanes. In the first two cases, the connector still can carry a full SuperSpeed signal; in the latter case, at least a non-SuperSpeed signal is available. The DisplayPort AUX channel is also supported over the two sideband signals over the same connection; furthermore, USB Power Delivery according to the newly expanded USB-PD 2.0 specification is possible at the same time. This makes the Type-C connector a strict superset of the use-cases envisioned for DockPort, SlimPort, Mini and Micro DisplayPort.

VirtualLink 

VirtualLink is a proposal that allows the power, video, and data required to drive virtual reality headsets to be delivered over a single USB-C cable.

Products 

Since its introduction in 2006, DisplayPort has gained popularity within the computer industry and is featured on many graphic cards, displays, and notebook computers. Dell was the first company to introduce a consumer product with a DisplayPort connector, the Dell UltraSharp 3008WFP, which was released in January 2008. Soon after, AMD and Nvidia released products to support the technology. AMD included support in the Radeon HD 3000 series of graphics cards, while Nvidia first introduced support in the GeForce 9 series starting with the GeForce 9600 GT.

Later the same year, Apple introduced several products featuring a Mini DisplayPort. The new connector proprietary at the time eventually became part of the DisplayPort standard, however Apple reserves the right to void the license should the licensee "commence an action for patent infringement against Apple". In 2009, AMD followed suit with their Radeon HD 5000 Series of graphics cards, which featured the Mini DisplayPort on the Eyefinity versions in the series.

Nvidia launched NVS 810 with 8 Mini DisplayPort outputs on a single card on 4 November 2015.

Nvidia revealed the GeForce GTX 1080, the world's first graphics card with DisplayPort 1.4 support on 6 May 2016. AMD followed with the Radeon RX 480 to support DisplayPort 1.3/1.4 on 29 June 2016. The Radeon RX 400 Series will support DisplayPort 1.3 HBR and HDR10, dropping the DVI connector(s) in the reference board design.

In February 2017, VESA and Qualcomm announced that DisplayPort Alt Mode video transport will be integrated into the Snapdragon 835 mobile chipset, which powers smartphones, VR/AR head-mounted displays, IP cameras, tablets and mobile PCs.

Support for DisplayPort Alternate Mode over USB-C 

Currently, DisplayPort is the most widely implemented alternate mode, and is used to provide video output on devices that do not have standard-size DisplayPort or HDMI ports, such as smartphones, tablets, and laptops. A USB-C multiport adapter converts the device's native video stream to DisplayPort/HDMI/VGA, allowing it to be displayed on an external display, such as a television set or computer monitor.

Examples of devices that support DisplayPort Alternate Mode over USB-C include: MacBook, Chromebook Pixel, Surface Book 2, Samsung Galaxy Tab S4, iPad Pro (3rd generation), HTC 10/U Ultra/U11/U12+, Huawei Mate 10/20/30, LG V20/V30/V40*/V50, OnePlus 7 and newer, ROG Phone, Samsung Galaxy S8 and newer, Sony Xperia 1/5 etc.

Participating companies 
The following companies have participated in preparing the drafts of DisplayPort, eDP, iDP, DDM or DSC standards:

 Agilent
 Altera
 AMD Graphics Product Group
 Analogix
 Apple
 Astrodesign
 BenQ
 Broadcom Corporation
 Chi Mei Optoelectronics
 Chrontel
 Dell
 Display Labs
 Foxconn Electronics
 FuturePlus Systems
 Genesis Microchip
 Gigabyte Technology
 Hardent
 Hewlett-Packard
 Hosiden
 Hirose Electric Group
 Intel
 intoPIX
 I-PEX
 Integrated Device Technology
 JAE Electronics
 Kawasaki Microelectronics (K-Micro)
 Keysight Technologies
 Lenovo
 LG Display
 Luxtera
 Molex
 NEC
 NVIDIA
 NXP Semiconductors
 Xi3 Corporation
 Parade Technologies
 Realtek Semiconductor
 Samsung
 SMK
 STMicroelectronics
 Synaptics Inc.
 SyntheSys Research Inc.
 Teledyne LeCroy (QuantumData)
 Tektronix
 Texas Instruments
 TLi
 Tyco Electronics
 ViewSonic
 VTM

The following companies have additionally announced their intention to implement DisplayPort, eDP or iDP:

 Acer
 ASRock
 Biostar
 Chroma
 BlackBerry
 Circuit Assembly
 DataPro
 Eizo
 Fujitsu
 Hall Research Technologies
 ITE Tech.
 Matrox Graphics
 Micro-Star International
 MStar Semiconductor
 Novatek Microelectronics Corp.
 Palit Microsystems Ltd.
 Pioneer Corporation
 S3 Graphics
 Toshiba
 Philips
 Quantum Data
 Sparkle Computer
 Unigraf
 Xitrix

See also 
 HDBaseT
 HDMI
 List of video connectors
 Thunderbolt (interface)

Notes

References

External links 

  the official site operated by VESA

Digital display connectors
VESA
Computer connectors
Serial buses